The 1987 Soul Train Music Awards aired live on March 23, 1987 (and was later syndicated in other areas), honoring the best in R&B, soul, rap, jazz, and gospel music from the previous year. The show was held at the Santa Monica Civic Auditorium in Los Angeles, California and was hosted by Luther Vandross and Dionne Warwick.

Special awards

Heritage Award for Career Achievement
 Stevie Wonder

Winners and nominees
Winners are in bold text.

Album of the Year – Male
 Luther Vandross – Give Me the Reason
 Freddie Jackson – Rock Me Tonight
 Billy Ocean – Love Zone
 Stevie Wonder – In Square Circle

Album of the Year – Female
 Janet Jackson – Control
 Anita Baker – Rapture
 Whitney Houston – Whitney Houston
 Patti LaBelle – Winner in You

Album of the Year – Group, Duo, or Band
 Cameo – Word Up!
 Atlantic Starr – As the Band Turns
 Kool & the Gang – Forever
 Run–D.M.C. – Raising Hell

Best Single – Male
 Gregory Abbott – "Shake You Down"
 Freddie Jackson – "Tasty Love"
 Prince – "Kiss"
 Luther Vandross – "Give Me the Reason"

Best Single – Female
 Anita Baker – "Sweet Love"
 Whitney Houston – "The Greatest Love of All"
 Janet Jackson – "What Have You Done for Me Lately"
 Meli'sa Morgan – "Do Me Baby"

Best Single – Group, Duo, or Band
 Cameo – "Word Up"
 Atlantic Starr – "Secret Lovers"
 Timex Social Club – "Rumors"
 Dionne Warrick and Friends – "That's What Friends Are For"

Best Rap Single
 Run–D.M.C. – "Walk This Way"
 Joeski Love – "Peewee's Dance"
 Timex Social Club – "Rumors"
 Whodini – "One Love"

Best Music Video
 Janet Jackson – "What Have You Done for Me Lately"
 Anita Baker – "Sweet Love"
 Cameo – "Word Up"
 Peter Gabriel – "Sledgehammer"

Best New Artist
 Gregory Abbott
 Club Nouveau
 The Jets
 Shirley Murdock

Best Rap Album
 Run–D.M.C. – Raising Hell
 Fat Boys – Fat Boys Are Back
 LL Cool J – Radio
 Whodini – Back in Black

Best Gospel Album – Solo
 Al Green – He Is the Light
 Shirley Caesar – Celebration
 Andraé Crouch – Autograph
 Tramaine – The Search Is Over

Best Gospel Album – Group, Duo, or Choir
 The Winans – Let My People Go
 Aretha Franklin with James Cleveland and the Southern California Community Choir – Amazing Grace
 Various Artists – The Color Purple Original Motion Picture Soundtrack
 The Williams Brothers – Blessed

Best Jazz Album – Solo
 George Howard – Love Will Follow
 Miles Davis – Tutu
 Kenny G – Duotones
 Sade – Promise

Best Jazz Album – Group, Duo, or Band
 Bob James and David Sanborn – Double Vision
 Spyro Gyra – Breakout
 Hiroshima – Another Place
 The Yellowjackets – Shades

Performers
 Cameo – "Word Up!"
 LL Cool J – "I'm Bad"
 Al Jarreau
 Run–D.M.C. and Aerosmith – "Walk This Way"
 Whitney Houston – "You Give Good Love"
 George Benson
 Luther Vandross – "So Amazing"
 Bob James
 Dionne Warwick and Luther Vandross – Medley: "My Cherie Amour" / "All is Fair in Love" / "You Are the Sunshine of My Life" / "I Just Called to Say I Love You"
 Stevie Wonder – "I Can Only Be Me"
 David Sanborn, Bob James, George Benson, and the George Duke Jazz Orchestra – "It's You"
 Cissy Houston, Vanessa Bell Armstrong, Andrae Crouch, Sandra Crouch, Shirley Caesar, Tramaine Hawkins, Edwin Hawkins, The Williams Brothers and The Winans – "Mary Don't You Weep"
 Carlos Vega
 George Duke
 Luther Vandross, Whitney Houston, Dionne Warwick and Stevie Wonder – "That's What Friends Are For"

Soul Train Music Awards
Soul
Soul
Soul Train
Soul Train Music Awards